Lee Vernon McNeill (December 2, 1964 – September 29, 2021) was an American track and field athlete who was a Five time All-American, record holding sprinter at East Carolina University.

Career
Lee McNeill was recruited by Bill Carson 1984 out of St. Pauls for East Carolina University. He specialized in the 100 metres.

McNeill made a name for himself in 1985 when he defeated Olympic gold medalist Carl Lewis in the semifinals of the 100-meter dash at the USA outdoor track and field championships. McNeill placed second in the final, outrunning both the world record holder and the NCAA champion. Later that summer he dropped the baton in a Pan American Games relay, but still managed to bring home three bronze medals from the National Sports Festival and the World University Games. His first gold medal of the summer came in June at the U.S. Olympic Festival in Durham. McNeill also picked up a bronze medal in the 100-meter dash.

He won the gold medal in 4 x 100 metres relay at the 1987 World Championships, together with Lee McRae, Harvey Glance and Carl Lewis.

His personal best time over 100 metres is 10.09 seconds, achieved on June 17, 1988, in Tampa when finishing 3rd in The Athletics Congress final. McNeill teamed with Carl Lewis, Harvey Glance and Lee McRae to win the 4X100 relay in the Pan American Games. McNeill was a member of the 1988 Olympic team that competed in Seoul, South Korea.

Recognition
On April 18, 2010, McNeill was one of the six new inductees into the Robeson County Sports Hall of Fame ceremony in Pembroke, North Carolina.

Personal life and death
McNeill lived in Greenville, North Carolina. He died from COVID-19 on September 29, 2021, during the COVID-19 pandemic in North Carolina. He struggled to breathe after being diagnosed with the virus in late August and had been hospitalized in the weeks before his death.

References

1964 births
2021 deaths
People from Lumberton, North Carolina
East Carolina University alumni
American male sprinters
Athletes (track and field) at the 1988 Summer Olympics
Olympic track and field athletes of the United States
World Athletics Championships medalists
Pan American Games gold medalists for the United States
Pan American Games medalists in athletics (track and field)
Universiade medalists in athletics (track and field)
People from St. Pauls, North Carolina
Athletes (track and field) at the 1987 Pan American Games
Universiade bronze medalists for the United States
World Athletics Championships winners
Medalists at the 1987 Pan American Games
Deaths from the COVID-19 pandemic in North Carolina